Dublin, also known as Hopson Bayou, is a census-designated place and unincorporated community located along U.S. Route 49 in southeastern Coahoma County, Mississippi, United States. Dublin is located on the Mississippi Delta Railroad. Dublin has a ZIP code of 38739. A post office first began operation under the name Dublin in 1875.

It was first named as a CDP in the 2020 Census which listed a population of 24.

Demographics

2020 census

Note: the US Census treats Hispanic/Latino as an ethnic category. This table excludes Latinos from the racial categories and assigns them to a separate category. Hispanics/Latinos can be of any race.

Notable people
Jimmy Burns, soul blues and electric blues guitarist, singer and songwriter
Little Willy Foster (1922 – 1987) was a Chicago blues musician, who was born in Dublin.
Aaron Henry, Civil rights leader
Malcolm Mabry, former member of the Mississippi House of Representatives and Mississippi Senate

References

Unincorporated communities in Coahoma County, Mississippi
Unincorporated communities in Mississippi
Census-designated places in Coahoma County, Mississippi